"Drowns the Whiskey" is a song written by Josh Thompson, Brandon Kinney, and Jeff Middleton and recorded by American country music singer Jason Aldean featuring Miranda Lambert. It was released in May 2018 as the second single from Aldean's album Rearview Town.

History and content
The song is a steel guitar-led song with neotraditional country influences. In it, the male narrator sings about his vain attempts to "drown" the memory of a former loved one by drinking whiskey, but instead observes that the memory of said lover "drowns the whiskey."

Aldean said that he was a "big fan" of Lambert, and had wanted to do a second duet with her after "Grown Woman", an album track from his 2007 album Relentless. After she expressed indifference to the first song he had suggested to her, he sent her "Drowns the Whiskey" and she agreed to perform on it.

Commercial performance
The song reached No. 1 on the Country Airplay chart  for chart dated August 25, 2018, where it then stayed for a further week. It is Aldean's 19th, and Lambert's 6th, No. 1 on the Country Airplay chart. It also reached No. 3 on the Hot Country Songs for chart dated September 1, 2018. It has sold 242,000 copies in the United States as of December 2018.

Music video
The music video for the song was released on June 18, 2018. It retells the song's story in an "empty Nashville dive bar".

Live performances
Aldean performed the song live on the CMT Music Awards on June 6, 2018. Lambert did not attend the performance, so backing vocalists in his road band performed her part. Aldean and Lambert performed the song live together for the first time on the 52nd Annual Country Music Association Awards telecast together on November 14, 2018.

Charts

Weekly charts

Year-end charts

Certifications

References

2018 songs
2018 singles
Country ballads
2010s ballads
Jason Aldean songs
Miranda Lambert songs
BBR Music Group singles
Male–female vocal duets
Songs written by Josh Thompson (singer)
Song recordings produced by Michael Knox (record producer)
Songs written by Brandon Kinney